Douglas Century (born in Calgary, Alberta, Canada) is a Canadian-American author and journalist. He was educated at Princeton University.

Journalism

As a journalist, Century has written for numerous publications, including The New York Times, Billboard, Details, Rolling Stone, Men's Journal, Blender, VIBE and The Guardian. He has written frequently about hip-hop and pop culture trends in The New York Times.

Books

In several nonfiction books, Century has written about diverse subjects, ranging from inner-city gangs, organized-crime, undercover police investigations, military operations and the history of Jewish prizefighting in the United States.

Street Kingdom 

Century's first book, Street Kingdom: Five Years Inside the Franklin Avenue Posse, was cited by many critics as a significant work of "participatory journalism."  "Merits a place alongside The Grapes Of Wrath and Native Son," wrote the Detroit Free Press in February 1998. "Street Kingdom ... is an inventive mix of courageous investigative reporting, accomplished storytelling, knowing social commentary and wicked street-smart prose...One of the miracles of this book is that it occurred at all."  Publishers Weekly called the debut book, "At once mesmerizing, humorous and tragic....A heady mixture of reportage and memoir."

Takedown: The Fall of the Last Mafia Empire 

Century's second book, describing Operation Wasteland, was Takedown: The Fall of the Last Mafia Empire (coauthored with NYPD Detective First-Grade Rick Cowan) was a The New York Times best-seller, a finalist for the 2003 Edgar Award ("Best Fact Crime"), and a finalist for the 2003 Audie Awards ("Best Audiobook of the Year, Non-Fiction, Abridged", as read by actor Christopher Meloni). Newsweek described the book as a "new gangland epic."

Barney Ross: The Life of a Jewish Fighter 

Following the publication of his third book, the best-seller Barney Ross, Century has toured extensively, speaking across the United States and Canada about the life and times of Ross (born Dov Ber Rasofsky), the Hall of Fame boxing great and World War II hero.  "This is an excellent story of a man and his times," wrote boxing historian Bert Randolph Sugar in The New York Times Book Review. "And proof positive that time does not relinquish its hold over men or monuments. In a sport devoted to fashioning halos for its superstars, Ross wore a special nimbus, and this book properly fits him for that."

Military Books: Brotherhood of Warriors and  If Not Now, When? 

Century is the coauthor of Brotherhood of Warriors:  Behind Enemy Lines with a Commando in one of the World’s Most Elite Counterterrorism Units, with former Israeli Special Forces operative Aaron Cohen, published by Ecco/HarperCollins in April 2008. The book recounts Cohen's work in the mid-1990s as a member of Duvdevan Unit (lit. cherry) a controversial Special Forces outfit which runs missions targeting wanted terrorist suspects in the occupied territories of the West Bank, often while posing in undercover disguise as Palestinian Arabs.

In October 2008, the Penguin Group published the memoir of Congressional Medal of Honor recipient Colonel Jack H. Jacobs,  If Not Now, When?: Duty and Sacrifice In America's Time of Need, coauthored by Douglas Century, with a foreword by NBC Nightly News anchor and managing editor Brian Williams.

If Not Now, When? is the winner of the 2010 Colby Award, recognizing "a first work of fiction or nonfiction that has made a significant contribution to the public's understanding of intelligence operations, military history, or international affairs."

Books with Ice-T 

In 2011, Century was the coauthor, with iconic hip-hop artist and actor Ice-T, of Ice: A Memoir of Gangster Life and Redemption—from South Central to Hollywood, published by Random House/One World.  The Associated Press called the book, "as cool as its namesake... a fascinating memoir, the pages of which are jam-packed with tales of a guy who ‘actively did everything I rhymed about.’"

The New York Times Book Review saw the book as the embodiment of "hip-hop's Horatio Alger" myth: "Ice-T, in short, is someone hip-hop might have invented if he hadn’t invented himself," reviewer Baz Dreisinger wrote. "A goes-down-easy mélange of memoir, self-help, and amateur criminology. Ultimately, Ice showcases an eminently reasonable, positively likeable guy, the gangsta rapper even a parent could love."

In July 2022, Century again collaborated with Ice-T on Split Decision: Life Stories (Gallery Books), a dual memoir told by Ice-T and his former partner-in-crime, Spike, about their early days as jewel thieves and street hustlers in Los Angeles and their vastly diverging life trajectories. Publishers Weekly in its starred review called the book "a propulsive chronicle...This grave and astonishing account will leave fans in awe,"  while Booklist called Split Decision "an astounding and provocative tale ...  a powerful memoir of diverging lives.”

Hunting El Chapo 

In April 2018, Century coauthored Hunting El Chapo (HarperCollins) with former DEA Special Agent Andrew Hogan, an account of Hogan's eight year investigation to track down and ultimately capture the world's most-wanted drug-trafficker Joaquín Archivaldo Guzmán Loera a.k.a. El Chapo. The book was the subject of a one-hour Dateline special Inside the Hunt for El Chapo, hosted by Lester Holt which premiered on April 8, 2018. The book was published worldwide in numerous translations, including Spanish, French, Italian, Portuguese, German, Dutch and Japanese. USA Today described the book as "Cinematic ... captivating ... the most authentic glimpse inside the world of El Chapo — because Hogan actually went there and did what few thought possible."

In March 2017, Variety reported that Hunting El Chapo had optioned for a feature film by Sony Pictures with 3 Arts Entertainment and Michael Bay producing.

No Surrender 

In 2019, Century coauthored No Surrender (Harper One) with Pastor Chris Edmonds, a work of narrative nonfiction chronicling the World War II experiences of Edmond’s late father, U.S. Army Master Sgt. Roddie Edmonds of the 106th Infantry Division. Captured during the vicious fighting in the Battle of the Bulge in December 1944, imprisoned in Germany’s Stalag IXA, Master Sgt. Edmonds refused the order of a Nazi major to identify the Jewish servicemen among the prisoners, stating, “We are all Jews here.” For his defense of Jewish servicemen at the POW camp, Edmonds was posthumously awarded the title "Righteous Among the Nations" from Yad Vashem, Israel's highest honor for non-Jews who risked their own lives to save Jews during the Holocaust. Of 25,000 people to receive the award, Edmonds was the fifth of five Americans, and the only active serviceman during World War II.

No Surrender was a recipient of a 2020 Christopher Award as one of the best nonfiction books of the year.

The Last Boss of Brighton 

In July 2022, Century published The Last Boss of Brighton (William Morrow), a true crime book that tells the rise and fall of notorious Belarusian-Jewish mobster Boris Nayfeld as well as the history of Soviet-emigre organized crime in the United States. Kirkus Reviews in a starred review called The Last Boss of Brighton "a fascinating, page-turning story of a genuine scoundrel. Century thrillingly chronicles Nayfeld’s criminal career... True-crime fans will find this one irresistible."

Reviewing the book in the Sunday Telegraph Jack Kerridge called The Last Boss of Brighton "a brilliant, blood-soaked biography ... so enjoyably mayhem-crammed as to make Howard Marks's drug-smuggling memoir Mr Nice read like Barbara Pym ... Nayfeld is a fiendishly compelling presence on the page."

In her January 7, 2023 review in the Globe and Mail, Emily Donaldson opined that the book offered an "exciting" break from true-crime conventions: "Douglas Century’s The Last Boss of Brighton offers up the sordidly riveting tale of Belarusian heroin trafficker Boris Nayfeld....The stories themselves are as mind-boggling in their extremity as they are disarming in their honesty. As he recounts, in granular detail, crimes ranging from pickpocketing to violent hold-ups to a massive gas-tax swindling scheme that netted him millions, Nayfeld gives us a tour of a parallel criminal world, with all its attendant rules and 'ethics.' Some of The Last Boss’s most head-spinny moments occur when that world intersects with banal aspects of our own."

Other

Century holds dual United States and Canadian citizenship.

Century is a member of the Writers Guild of America, East and the Writers Guild of Canada.

Bibliography

Books
Street Kingdom: Five Years Inside the Franklin Avenue Posse (New York: Warner Books, 1999), a portrait of hip-hop and gangster subculture set in Brooklyn.
Takedown: The Fall of the Last Mafia Empire, (New York: G.P. Putnam's Sons, 2002), an investigative account of Operation Wasteland co-authored with NYPD Detective Rick Cowan.
Barney Ross (New York: Nextbook/Schocken: 2006), a biography of the legendary Jewish boxing champion Barney Ross and Silver Star-awarded U.S. Marine Corps hero of the Battle of Guadalcanal.
 Brotherhood of Warriors:  Behind Enemy Lines with a Commando in one of the World’s Most Elite Counterterrorism Units, by Aaron Cohen and Douglas Century (New York: Ecco, 2008).
 If Not Now, When?: Duty and Sacrifice In America's Time of Need, by Colonel Jack Jacobs (Ret.) and Douglas Century (New York: Berkley Caliber, 2008), a memoir of the famed Congressional Medal of Honor recipient and NBC military analyst.  Winner of the 2010 Colby Award.
 Ice: A Memoir of Gangster Life and Redemption—from South Central to Hollywood, by Ice-T and Douglas Century (New York: Random House, 2011. .
 The Dark Art:  My Undercover Life in Global Narcoterrorism (New York: Gotham Books, 2014), coauthored with retired DEA Special Agent Edward Follis.
Hunting El Chapo: The Inside Story of the American Lawman Who Captured the World's Most-Wanted Drug Lord, (New York: HarperCollins, 2018) a detailed nonfiction account of the eight-year investigation and manhunt for Mexican narcotrafficker Joaquín Archivaldo Guzmán Loera a.k.a. "El Chapo" – leader of the Sinaloa Cartel (Spanish: Cártel de Sinaloa); coauthored with former DEA Special Agent Andrew Hogan.
No Surrender: A Father, a Son, and an Extraordinary Act of Heroism That Continues to Live on Today, (New York: Harper One, 2019) coauthored with Pastor Chris Edmonds. Winner of a 2020 Christopher Award.
The Last Boss of Brighton: Boris "Biba" Nayfeld and the Rise of the Russian Mob in America, (New York: William Morrow, 2022).
Split Decision: Life Stories (New York: Gallery Books, 2022) by Ice-T & Spike and Douglas Century.

Essays and reporting
 "Boxing" by Douglas Century, in Jews and American Popular Culture, Vol. III, by Paul Buhle (ed.), (Greenwood Publishing: 2006)
 "My Brooklyn: Still a Contender on the Waterfront," by Douglas Century, The New York Times Arts & Leisure Section, March 12, 1999 
 "Not So Fly for This White Guy," by Douglas Century, The New York Times Sunday Styles, January 31, 1999 
 "Alpine, NJ: Home to Hip-Hop Royalty," by Douglas Century, The New York Times Arts & Leisure Section, February 11, 2007 
 "The Blatnoy," by Douglas Century, Tablet Magazine, August 29, 2022
 "Opinion: Vladimir Putin is the Most Brazen, Powerful and Wealthy Mobster of All Time," by Douglas Century, Globe and Mail, July 23, 2022

Critical studies and reviews
 "Punching Through"  Barney Ross reviewed in The New York Times Book Review by Bert Randolph Sugar, February 19, 2006.
 "Two-Fisted Hero" Barney Ross reviewed  in The Washington Post by Jonathan Yardley, January 17, 2006.
 "A Jew in the Modern World" Barney Ross reviewed in The New York Sun by Carl Rollyson, February 8, 2006.
 "Ice-T, Living Out Loud," Ice reviewed in The New York Times Book Review by Baz Dreisinger, April 22, 2011.
  Review of The dark art.

See also
Barney Ross
Joaquín Archivaldo Guzmán Loera
Ice-T
Jack H. Jacobs
Roddie Edmonds
Boris Nayfeld
Operation Wasteland
Aaron Cohen
Jailhouse rock (fighting style)

Notes

References
Anglo-American Name Authority File, s.v. “Century, Douglas”, LC Control Number n 93071869. Accessed 7 March 2007.
AudioFile Publications. The 2003 Audie Awards Winners; Finalists; Non-Fiction, Abridged. Accessed 7 March 2007.
Bookreporter.com. The 2003 Edgar Awards; The 2003 Edgar Award Nominees; Best Fact Crime. Accessed 7 March 2007.
Penguin Group USA, s.v. "Douglas Century". Accessed 7 March 2007.
Random House. Barney Ross, About the Author. Accessed 7 March 2007.
PR Newswire: If Not Now, When? Wins 2010 Colby Award.
. Accessed 30 September 2022.
. Accessed 30 September 2022.

External links
Author Website
NextBook's 2006 interview and Podcast with Douglas Century on Barney Ross conducted by Jeff Z. Klein, of the New York Times
An interview with author Douglas Century on Eight Forty-Eight radio program, WBEZ public radio; Chicago, Illinois; March 9, 2006.
A Rough and Tumble Life," Douglas Century on The Leonard Lopate Show on WNYC.
BBC World Service Audio interview with Douglas Century about the Mafia's historic control of garbage-hauling in New York
Brotherhood of Warriors HarperCollins site
If Not Now, When? web site of the Penguin Group.
Ice Random House web site.

Living people
Canadian expatriate journalists in the United States
Canadian investigative journalists
Journalists from Alberta
People from Calgary
Year of birth missing (living people)